The 2010–11 Euro Hockey League was the fourth season of the Euro Hockey League, Europe's premier club field hockey tournament organized by the EHF. It was held at four different locations from October 2010 until June 2011.

The final was played between Club de Campo and HGC at De Roggewoning in Wassenaar, Netherlands. HGC beat Club de Campo 1–0 to win their first title. UHC Hamburg were the defending champions, but they were eliminated by Bloemendaal in the round of 16. Reading took the bronze medal.

Association team allocation

A total of 24 teams from 12 of the 45 EHF member associations participated in the 2010–11 Euro Hockey League. The association ranking based on the EHL country coefficients is used to determine the number of participating teams for each association:
 Associations 1–4 each have three teams qualify.
 Associations 5–8 each have two teams qualify.
 Associations 9–12 each have one team qualify.

Association ranking

Teams

Round One
The 24 teams were drawn into eight pools of three. In each pool, teams played against each other once in a round-robin format. The pool winners and runners-up advanced to the round of 16. Pools A, C, D, and G were played in Terrassa, Spain from 29 to 31 October 2010 and the other pool were played in Eindhoven, Netherlands from 15 to 17 October 2017. If a game was won, the winning team received 5 points. A draw resulted in both teams receiving 2 points. A loss gave the losing team 1 point unless the losing team lost by 3 or more goals, then they received 0 points.

Pool A

Pool B

Pool C

Pool D

Pool E

Pool F

Pool G

Pool H

Knockout stage
The round of 16 and the quarter-finals were played in Bloemendaal, Netherlands from 22 to 25 April 2011 and the semi-finals, bronze medal match and the final were played in Wassenaar, Netherlands from 11 to 12 June 2011.

Bracket

Round of 16

Quarter-finals

Semi-finals

Bronze medal match

Final

Statistics

Top goalscorers

External links
Official website

Euro Hockey League
2010–11 in European field hockey
October 2010 sports events in Europe
April 2011 sports events in Europe
June 2011 sports events in Europe